WSEL-FM (96.7 FM) is a radio station  broadcasting a Christian radio format. Licensed to Pontotoc, Mississippi, United States, the station serves the Tupelo area.  The station is currently owned by Ollie Collins, Jr.

References

External links

Gospel radio stations in the United States
SEL-FM
Radio stations established in 1965